Julien Mortier (born 20 July 1997 in Tournai) is a Belgian cyclist, who currently rides for French amateur team Dunkerque Grand Littoral–Cofidis.

Major results
2017
 8th Druivenkoers Overijse

References

External links

1997 births
Living people
Belgian male cyclists
21st-century Belgian people